West Riverside may refer to;

 West Riverside, New Orleans, a neighborhood of New Orleans, Louisiana
 West Riverside, Montana
 West Riverside, a suburb of Riverside, Tasmania
 Jurupa Valley, California, previously referred to as West Riverside

See also
West Riverside Mountains in Riverside County, California